is a local political party in Okinawa, Japan. The party primarily adheres to social democracy.

History
The party was founded on 31 October 1950 during the US occupation of the region. On 29 April 1952, the party launched an Association for Promotion of Reversion to Japan, which initiated a signature campaign for the demand of reunification with Japan. The campaign gathered more than 199,000 signatures (72%+ of the eligible voters of Okinawa). At the time, such a campaign was initiated by liberals/leftists, including Okinawa Social Mass Party and another local party called .

After Okinawa's restoration to Japan in 1972, the latter party was merged into Japanese Communist Party. Okinawa Social Mass Party, on the other hand, did not join any mainland Japanese parties, and continues as a local party to this day.

The party has been influential as the leading left-of-centre party in the prefecture.

Members

Members of the House of Councillors of the National Diet
 (Officially counted as a member of Okinawa Whirlwind in the House of Councillors.)
Members of the Okinawa Prefectural Assembly

Members of the Naha City Council

Members of the Urasoe City Council

References

External links
 Official website

Political parties established in 1950
Politics of Okinawa
Centre-left parties in Asia
Left-wing parties in Japan
Regional parties in Japan
Social democratic parties in Japan
Progressive parties in Japan
1950 establishments in Japan